William Norwood may refer to:

 William Imon Norwood (1941–2020), American pediatric cardiothoracic surgeon
 William R. Norwood (1909–1981), American government official
 William Ray Norwood Jr. (born 1981), American singer

See also
 Willie Norwood (disambiguation)